Dawson County High School is a public high school in Glendive, Montana the eastern part of Montana known as the Badlands. Spencer Johnson is the principal.

Notable alumni
 Tim Babcock, the 16th Governor of the state of Montana, from 1962 to 1969
 Mike Person, an American football guard for the San Francisco 49ers of the National Football League.

Notable former faculty
 James Verne Dusenberry, taught English and Drama

References

Glendive Public Schools
Dawson County High School

Public high schools in Montana